Calculating Space is Konrad Zuse's 1969 book on automata theory. He proposed that all processes in the universe are computational. This view is known today as the simulation hypothesis, digital philosophy, digital physics or pancomputationalism. Zuse proposed that the universe is being computed by some sort of cellular automaton or other discrete computing machinery, challenging the long-held view that some physical laws are continuous by nature. He focused on cellular automata as a possible substrate of the computation, and pointed out that the classical notions of entropy and its growth do not make sense in deterministically computed universes. Zuse's thesis was later expanded by German computer scientist Jürgen Schmidhuber in his technical report Algorithmic Theories of Everything.

See also
 A New Kind of Science
 Simulated reality

References

Further reading
  (70+4 pages)
  (98 pages);  (69 pages)

External links
 Jürgen Schmidhuber's site Zuse's book and 1967 paper.
 Calculating Space - a painting by Zuse - Konrad Zuse's visualization of the idea
 Web article and simulation of such a calculating space in C and LIBPNG
 SecondSpace Simulation of waves within a 2D space (time and space are discrete), similar to FDTD. An OpenCL graphic card is needed.

Theoretical computer science
Konrad Zuse
1969 non-fiction books
Physics books
Cellular automata